The MRT 3, MRT Line 3 or MRT Circle Line is a proposed thirteenth rail transit line, the third Mass Rapid Transit line and the fourth fully automated and driverless rail system in the Klang Valley, Malaysia. Once completed, this line would form the loop line of the Klang Valley Integrated Transit System. The director of this project is currently Tuan Haji Mohd Yusof Kasiron. The circle line will be numbered .

It is one of three planned mass rapid transit (MRT) rail lines under the Klang Valley Mass Rapid Transit Project by MRT Corp. The MRT Circle Line is expected to form a loop line circling but not entering Kuala Lumpur's central business district, while linking up the radial rail lines. Interest in building the line resurfaced in early 2015; the project was shelved by former Prime Minister Mahathir Mohamad in May 2018 but was later on revived in November 2020. Constructions are expected to begin in early 2023 and slated for full completion by 2030, while operations for the first phase will commence in the year 2028. The estimated construction cost is expected to be in line with the MRT Putrajaya Line which will be around RM31 billion while the land acquisition cost is estimated to be at RM8 billion.

With 50.8 km of rail alignment, a total of 33 stations which will consist of 26 elevated and 7 underground stations will be built. The circle line is expected to stretch while forming a loop from Bukit Kiara to PPUM and it will include densely populated areas such as Mont Kiara, Segambut, KL Metropolis, Titiwangsa, Setapak, Setiawangsa, Ampang, Salak South, Pandan Indah, Pantai Dalam, Cheras and Universiti Malaya.

Chronology 
 12 August 2016 - MRT Corp announced that it is expected to submit the study on the MRT Line 3 to the government by year-end.
 6 September 2017 - Transport Minister Datuk Seri Liow Tiong Lai indicated that plans are being drawn up to fast-track the construction of MRT 3 for completion before 2027.
 27 October 2017 - During Budget 2018 announced on 27 Oct 2017, Prime Minister Najib Razak indicated that plans are being drawn up to fast-track the construction of MRT 3 for completion before 2025.
 3 January 2018 - The former CEO of Rapid Rail, Dato' Ir. Zohari Sulaiman, is appointed by MRT Corp to be the project director of this project.
 30 May 2018 - Prime Minister Mahathir Mohamad announced that the government would scrap the MRT 3 rail transit project.
 23 December 2019 - Transport Minister Anthony Loke stated that a review of MRT3 is currently under way.
 3 April 2021 - Approval of MRT3 by the Cabinet, with construction slated to begin in the second half of 2021.
 13 April 2021 - The project is expected to involve about 30 stations and 10 interchanges, covering the parameters of Kuala Lumpur and making one round from Bukit Kiara to University Malaya Medical Centre (UMMC). The project will also be built in five phases over 10 years.
6 August 2021 - According to a letter by MRT Corp, the company had issued a letter to the Mayor of Kuala Lumpur regarding about Environmental Impact Assessment (EIA) & Strategic Impact Assessment (SIA) activities which will be conducted by ERE Consulting Group from June 2021 to December 2021.
24 September 2021 - MRT Corp Chief Executive Officer Mohd Zarif Hashim addressed the importance of land public transport in the development and sustainability of a city in a City Expo Malaysia (CEM) Star Talk session. In his speech, he stated that the MRT Circle Line would complete the transport masterplan for Klang Valley, connecting the eight different radial lines and delivering passengers in a more efficient manner. He also said that MRT Corp will be sharing information regarding the line at the CEM virtual expo, the expo is said to be held between November and December of that year.
4 March 2022 -  Prime Minister Ismail Sabri said that the cabinet has granted and approved to proceed with the implementation of the MRT3 project once again. It was announced through a statement released by him.
15 March 2022 - A media briefing on MRT3 was hosted by MRT Corp with COO of Keretapi Tanah Melayu Berhad (KTM), CEO of Malaysia Rail Link (MRL), CEO of Prasarana Malaysia Berhad and Transport Minister Wee Ka Siong. MRT Corp CEO Datuk Mohd Zarif Hashim said that the line will have a circular alignment running along the perimeter of Kuala Lumpur at about 51km in length, split between 40km of elevated tracks and 11km of underground tunnels. The line is slated to be fully operational by 2030, with its first phase to begin in 2028.

Network
To date, no information is available on the actual alignment of the proposed line. The stations listed below were obtained from an MRT Corp proposal as of August 2022. All of the station names are interim and subject to change.

There will be a total of 31 stations (24 elevated + 7 underground) excluding 2 provisional stations and the 2 depots.

Project shelving 
On 1 June 2018 (2 days after the project has been shelved by the former Prime Minister), Dato' Sri Shahril Mokhtar who was chief executive officer of MRT Corp said that the cancellation of the project is not a mistake but it still needs to be done in the future.

"We abide by the government's decision (to discontinue the project) but we also acknowledge that the MRT line 3 is critical to close all the loop. We hope that one day in the future, once the government's fiscal position gets better, the government will consider this.", he added.

References

External links 
 Mass Rapid Transit Corporation Sdn Bhd (MRT Corp)
 Prasarana Malaysia Berhad (Prasarana)
 Suruhanjaya Pengangkutan Awam Darat (SPAD)
 MRT Circle Line - mrt.com.my

Proposed rail infrastructure in Malaysia
Klang Valley
2028 in rail transport